Tonje Sagstuen (born 17 November 1971 in Lørenskog) is a Norwegian team handball player and Olympic medalist. She received silver medals at the 1992 Summer Olympics in Barcelona. 
Tonje Sagstuen played 217 games for the national team during her career, scoring 593 goals.

In 2012, she became the new editor-in-chief of Oppland Arbeiderblad.

References

External links

1971 births
Living people
Sportspeople from Gjøvik
People from Lørenskog
Norwegian female handball players
Olympic silver medalists for Norway
Olympic handball players of Norway
Handball players at the 1992 Summer Olympics
Olympic medalists in handball
Norwegian newspaper editors
Women newspaper editors
Medalists at the 1992 Summer Olympics